Hannah Beckerman is an English author and journalist.  She studied at King's College London and Westfield College. She has worked with The Observer, The Guardian, the FT Weekend Magazine and The Sunday Express and has worked for twelve years in television including BBC's The Big Read. Beckerman lives in London with her husband and daughter.

She wrote two novels:
The Dead Wife's Handbook (Penguin, Feb 13, 2014)
If Only I Could Tell You (Orion, Feb 21, 2019)

References

Living people
English women novelists
English journalists
Alumni of King's College London
Alumni of Westfield College
The Observer people
Writers from London
Year of birth missing (living people)